The Battle of Olemdo can refer to either of two battles fought near Olmedo in Castile (now in the province of Valladolid, Spain):
First Battle of Olmedo (1445)
Second Battle of Olmedo (1467)